Tanith Jessica Louise Belbin White (born July 11, 1984) is a Canadian-American ice dancer and Olympic program host for NBC Sports. Though born in Canada, she holds dual citizenship and has competed for the United States since she began skating with Benjamin Agosto in 1998. With Agosto, Belbin is the 2006 Olympic silver medalist, four-time World medalist, three-time Four Continents champion (2004–2006), and five-time U.S. champion (2004–2008).

Personal life
Tanith Belbin was born in Kingston, Ontario, and raised in Kirkland, Quebec. In 1998, she moved to the Detroit area in the United States and received an immigrant worker visa in 2000. Due to immigration rules at the time, she did not receive a green card until July 2002 and would not have been granted U.S. citizenship until 2007. An amendment was passed which allowed Belbin to be sworn in as an American citizen on December 31, 2005. The amendment was authored by Senator Carl Levin who stated, "This amendment corrects an anomaly in the law that unfairly disadvantaged some people who had begun their naturalization process before 2002. Tanith Belbin began her naturalization process in 2000, but due to changes that were made to the law in 2002, the process has taken significantly longer than it would have if she had filed her paperwork 2 years later."

Belbin lived and trained in Canton, Michigan, for many years, before moving to Aston, Pennsylvania. After 2010, Belbin decided to move back to Michigan to attend Eastern Michigan University and be closer to friends and family, including then-boyfriend Charlie White. Belbin and White became engaged in June 2014 and were married on April 25, 2015. In 2017, their son was born.

Her father, Charles Belbin, is a public relations manager, while her mother, Michelle (née McKinlay) Belbin, is a former figure skater (who trained in St. John's, Newfoundland under Rolf Adomeit), coach, and costume designer. Michelle made some of Tanith's costumes.

Career 
Tanith Belbin began skating when she was almost three and started ice dancing at about eight or nine. She competed both as a pair skater and ice dancer in Canada before deciding to concentrate completely on ice dancing. She was introduced to ice dancing by Paul Wirtz and competed with partner Liam Dougherty. Her pairs partner was Ben Barruco, with whom she placed 2nd at the novice level at the 1997 Canadian Championships. She did not compete with either partner internationally.

Partnership with Agosto 
After a year without a partner in Canada, Belbin moved to Detroit in 1998, where she was partnered with Benjamin Agosto by their coach Igor Shpilband. In the 1999–2000 season, they won a pair of medals on the ISU Junior Grand Prix series and finished 4th at the JGP Final. They went on to win the U.S. junior national title and then took the bronze medal at the 2000 World Junior Championships. In 2000–2001, Belbin / Agosto competed again on the JGP series, taking gold in all three of their events including the Final. They appeared on the senior level at the 2001 U.S. Championships and won the silver medal, qualifying them for their first senior World Championships, where they finished 17th.

In 2001–2002, Belbin / Agosto made their senior Grand Prix debut and won another silver medal at the U.S. Championships, which would have qualified them for the 2002 Winter Olympics if Belbin had been an American citizen. Instead, Belbin and Agosto were sent to all the other ISU Championships for which they were eligible: Four Continents, Junior Worlds, and Worlds. They won the 2002 World Junior Championships, completing their set of medals from that event. Following that season, Agosto aged out of juniors.

Belbin / Agosto won the 2004 U.S. national title and would go on to repeat four times. At Nationals in 2005, the last year of the 6.0 system, Belbin / Agosto received straight perfect sixes for presentation in their free dance. Of the 30 6.0s given out in ice dance at U.S. Nationals, Belbin / Agosto have 14 of them. Their total 6.0 count at the U.S. Championships is second only to Michelle Kwan (38).

Belbin / Agosto won the silver medal at the 2005 World Championships.

Fans of Belbin / Agosto wrote letters and signed petitions asking for a special act of Congress to allow Belbin to become a citizen in time for her to compete at the 2006 Winter Olympics, where many believed they could win a medal. In addition, it was Belbin / Agosto who earned a third spot for the U.S. in the Olympic ice dancing event, by winning a medal at the 2005 World Championships, without which the U.S. would have had only two spots. However, the mother of fellow American ice dancer David Mitchell sent a letter to Senator Hillary Clinton, asking her to vote against it. She believed that it was unfair to bend the requirements for U.S. citizenship for Belbin, when other "aliens of extraordinary ability" were denied expedited citizenship. Ultimately, by a special act of Congress sponsored by Senator Carl Levin (D-MI) that passed on December 28, 2005, which President George W. Bush signed on December 31, 2005, Belbin became a naturalized citizen, allowing her to compete for the United States at the 2006 Winter Olympics.

In January 2006, Belbin / Agosto won their third consecutive national title and qualified for the Olympics. At the Turin Olympics, Belbin and Agosto won the silver medal in ice dancing, the first American ice dancers to win an Olympic medal in 30 years. They went on to win the bronze at Worlds.

Belbin / Agosto began the 2006–2007 season with a free dance called That's Entertainment but arrived at Nationals with a new program to the music of Amelie. They won gold at Nationals, the silver medal at Four Continents, and the bronze at Worlds.

In 2007–2008, they won gold medals at both Skate America and Cup of China which qualified them for the Grand Prix Final, where they took the silver medal. They won their 5th national title and then placed 4th at the 2008 Worlds after a fall by Belbin in the compulsory dance. Belbin / Agosto were regular cast members of the Champions on Ice tour from 2004 until COI went out of business following the 2007 season. They were guest stars on part of the 2008 Stars on Ice tour.

In April 2008, Belbin / Agosto left Igor Shpilband, who had coached them for their entire partnership, and began working with the married coaching team of Natalia Linichuk and Gennadi Karponosov at the IceWorks Skating Complex in Aston, Pennsylvania. In addition to teaching different technique, Linichuk advised Belbin to gain 10 pounds and develop some muscles in order to skate faster and more fluidly. This also gave Belbin more core strength to hold her positions better, thus making lifts easier for Agosto.

Belbin / Agosto began the 2008–2009 season at the 2008 Skate America and 2008 Cup of China, winning silver at both competitions. They withdrew from the 2008–2009 ISU Grand Prix Final after the original dance due to a back injury to Agosto. They withdrew from the 2009 U.S. Championships before the event began due to Agosto's injury. They were named to the team to the 2009 World Championships. At Worlds, they won the original dance and placed second in the compulsory and free dances to win the silver medal overall.

Belbin / Agosto won both their Grand Prix events in the 2009–10 season: the 2009 Cup of China and the 2009 Skate America. They withdrew from the Grand Prix Final for medical reasons. At the 2010 U.S. Championships, they were unable to reclaim their national title, finishing second behind Meryl Davis and Charlie White. Belbin and Agosto were nominated to represent the United States at the 2010 Winter Olympics. They finished 4th in the Olympic ice dancing event. They did not compete at the 2010 World Championships.

On June 10, 2010, Belbin / Agosto announced their retirement from eligible skating. They have continued to skate together in ice shows.

On December 15, 2015, U.S. Figure Skating announced Belbin and Agosto would be members of the U.S. Figure Skating Hall of Fame Class of 2016. The induction ceremony was held on January 22, 2016 at the 2016 U.S. Figure Skating Championships.

Post-competitive career
Belbin has worked as a commentator for ice dance competitions on Universal Sports Network, the ABC show Skating with the Stars, and for icenetwork.com. She has also worked as a commentator for four seasons of Curling Night in America, a NBCSN program that broadcasts a made-for-television curling competition.

In October 2011 Belbin competed as a pro on season 3 of Battle of the Blades paired with Boyd Devereaux; the pair placed 3rd in the competition.

Belbin also works as a choreographer.

Coaching Career 
In 2022, Belbin opened the Michigan Ice Dance Academy with Charlie White and Greg Zuerlein.
Their current teams include:

 Emily Bratti / Ian Somerville
 Molly Cesanek / Yehor Yehorov
 Caroline Green / Michael Parsons

Their former teams include:

 Katarina Wolfkostin / Jeffrey Chen

Programs

(with Agosto)

Competitive highlights

(ice dancing with Agosto)

(Pair skating with Barruco)

References

External links

 
 
 
 
 
 
 

1984 births
Living people
American female ice dancers
Anglophone Quebec people
Battle of the Blades participants
Canadian emigrants to the United States
Canadian female ice dancers
Figure skaters at the 2006 Winter Olympics
Figure skaters at the 2010 Winter Olympics
Four Continents Figure Skating Championships medalists
Medalists at the 2006 Winter Olympics
Olympic Games broadcasters
Olympic medalists in figure skating
Olympic silver medalists for the United States in figure skating
People from Canton, Michigan
People from Kirkland, Quebec
Sportspeople from Kingston, Ontario
World Figure Skating Championships medalists
World Junior Figure Skating Championships medalists
Competitors at the 2001 Goodwill Games
21st-century American women